Sympistis behrensi is a species of moth in the family Noctuidae (the owlet moths).

The MONA or Hodges number for Sympistis behrensi is 10155.

References

Further reading

 
 
 

behrensi
Articles created by Qbugbot
Moths described in 1874